Meuschenia hippocrepis, commonly called the horseshoe leatherjacket, is a filefish endemic to the eastern Indian Ocean, in the temperate waters off the south and west of Australia. It grows to a length of about 50 cm. Its common name comes from a distinct horseshoe-shaped marking on their side.  It occasionally makes its way into the aquarium trade.

Distribution
The fish occurs from the Houtman Abrolhos, Western Australia, to Wilsons Promontory, Victoria, and south to Bicheno, Tasmania.

It is often found around rocky reefs, and in deeper bays and estuaries.

References

 

Monacanthidae
Fish described in 1824